The Famous Mrs. Fair is a 1923 American silent drama film produced by Louis B. Mayer, distributed through Metro Pictures, and directed by Fred Niblo. The film is based on the Broadway play of the same name by James Forbes that had starred Blanche Bates in the 1919 theatre season.  Brief behind-the-scenes production footage is extant in the recently restored Souls for Sale (1923). A copy is held at George Eastman House, donated by MGM for preservation.

Cast
 Myrtle Stedman as Mrs. Fair
 Huntley Gordon as Jeffrey Fair
 Marguerite De La Motte as Sylvia Fair
 Cullen Landis as Alan Fair
 Ward Crane as Dudley Gillette
 Carmel Myers as Angy Brice
 Helen Ferguson as Peggy
 Lydia Yeamans Titus 
 Dorcas Matthews 
 Frankie Bailey
 Josephine Kirkwood
 Muriel Beresford
 Eva Mudge
 Kathleen Chambers
 Peggy Blackwood

References

External links

1923 films
1923 drama films
Silent American drama films
American silent feature films
American black-and-white films
Films directed by Fred Niblo
Films with screenplays by Frances Marion
Metro Pictures films
1920s American films
1920s English-language films